Skumin is a Lithuanian, Polish and Russian masculine nobleman surname, its feminine counterpart is Skumina.

Notable people with the surname
Alexander Skumin (1748–1775), statesman of the Polish–Lithuanian Commonwealth
Andrew N. Skumin (1909–1984), WWII Veteran, officer of MGB of the USSR, Chairman of the Military Tribunal of the Internal Troops of the Volga Military District
Anna Skumina (1730–1772)
Anthony Skumin (1899–1965), WWI Veteran US Army
Edward A Skumin (1898–1935), WWI Veteran US Army
Ivan Skumin (?–1566)
Janusz Skumin (1570–1642), Polish nobleman and politician
Jerzy Skumin (1596–1656), religious leader and statesman of the Grand Duchy of Lithuania
John Skumin Sr (1935–2014) was a graduate of Berkshire Community College with an associate degree in Criminal Justice. He served in the Massachusetts National Guard.
Józef Skumin (1716–1790), knight of the Order of the White Eagle (Poland)
Katarzyna Eugenia Skumina (1610–1648), Polish noble lady
Ludwik Skumin (1748–1808), Field Lithuanian Hetman (Grand Treasurer) of Polish-Lithuanian Commonwealth. He received the Russian Orders of St. Alexander Nevsky and of St. Andrew
Theodor Skumin (1538–1618), Royal nobleman of the Grand Duchy of Lithuania 
Victor A. Skumin (born 1948), Russian scientist, philosopher and writer
V. L. Skumin

Gallery

References

External links

Lithuanian noble families
Polish noble families
Russian-language surnames
Russian noble families